Jesmond Parish Church is a parish church in the Church of England situated in Brandling Village in the Jesmond suburb of Newcastle upon Tyne, Tyne and Wear, England. The church's official name is the Clayton Memorial Church and is unusual among Anglican parish churches in not being named after either a saint who appears in the church's calendar or a person of the Trinity. This reflects the church's conservative Evangelical roots. It is a grade II listed building.

History 
The church had a slightly unusual beginning. 1856 saw the death of the Revd Richard Clayton, Master of St Thomas' Church in Haymarket and a local Evangelical luminary. In his place the church authorities wished to appoint a high church successor who was out of sympathy with Clayton's Reformed Evangelical principles. A large number of the congregation of St Thomas's were deeply unhappy. A committee was formed with the intention of planting a new church nearby, which "will form a central point for the maintenance and promulgation of sound scriptural and evangelical truth in a large and populous town." At the time, much of the land around the site was open fields; the building was designed by the architect John Dobson and consecrated in 1861. A vestry was added in 1874.

List of vicars 

1861-1882 Canon Berkeley Addison
1882-1888 Canon Somerset Pennefather
1889-1894 Theodore Charles Chapman
1894-1897 Edwin Savage
1898-1907 Canon Thomas Brocas Waters
1907-1916 Canon James Inskip
1916-1927 Canon George Oakley
1927-1947 Canon George Goddard
1947-1959 Harry Bates
1960-1972 Roger Frith
1973–present David Holloway

Organ 

The church houses a pipe organ by the notable builder James Jepson Binns of Leeds which dates from 1913, although it has fallen into severe disrepair and is no longer played. It contains pipework from an organ by T. C. Lewis of 1895. A specification of the organ can be found on the National Pipe Organ Register.

List of organists 
Charles Chambers 1882-1890
John Murray 1890 - ????
Claud H. Hill
J.E.Hutchinson 1903- 947
George Henry Sutcliffe 1947-1978 - ????
Chris Foy
Chris Edwards 1996-2011

List of assistant organists 
Clifford Harker 1928-1930
Graham Steed 1934-1941
Miles Cragg 2006–present

Present day
Jesmond Parish Church is a conservative evangelical Anglican church of approximately 1,100 people.  Currently the leadership team of the church includes David Holloway (vicar since 1973), Jonathan Pryke, Jonathan Redfearn, Ian Garrett and Alan Munden. The church is noted for its preaching, which aims to be expository and evangelistic.

Liturgically the church is conservative, adopting the north side position at services of Holy Communion. ASB Rite A (Prayer Book Pattern) is used. Services of Morning and Evening Prayer are based on the Series 3 forms. Hymns are from Hymns for Today's Church, published by the evangelical Anglican "Jubilate" group.

The church has a close relationship with the Christian Institute whose national headquarters are also in Newcastle. David Holloway is a prominent member of the institute. Both organisations take a strong stance against homosexual practice, in more recent times in relation to the legislation on civil partnerships, which has led to the church's services being picketed on a number of occasions by gay rights activists. In October 1999 the church was vandalised with graffiti opposing the church's stance on human sexuality.

Jesmond Parish Church is a member of Reform, a network of evangelical churches within the Church of England which includes some of the largest Anglican churches in UK. Other churches with similar theology include:

St Andrew The Great, Cambridge
St Ebbe's, Oxford
St Helen's Bishopsgate
Christ Church, Fulwood, Sheffield

On 2 May 2017, Jonathan Pryke, a minister of Jesmond Parish Church, was consecrated a bishop by Glenn Lyons, the Presiding Bishop of the Reformed Evangelical Anglican Church of South Africa (REACH-SA). This was controversial due to REACH-SA's status outside of the Anglican Communion, and because the consecration occurred "without the knowledge of the diocese or its Bishop" (the Bishop of Newcastle).

References

Further reading 
A Light in a Dark Place by Alan Munden (Clayton Publications, 2006; 286 pp) is a history of the church.

External links 
Jesmond Parish Church website
Jesmond Parish Church Hockey Club's website
Clayton.tv website

Church of England church buildings in Tyne and Wear
Churches in Newcastle upon Tyne
Churches completed in 1861
Evangelicalism in the Church of England
1861 establishments in England